Bonnafet Tarbouriech (born 21 April 1952) is a French actor. He appeared in more than sixty films since 1980.

Filmography

References

External links 

1952 births
Living people
French male film actors
People from Nîmes